Jérémie Basilua is a Congolese international football player.

He scored against the Seychelles on 29 February 2012.

He was named in the Congolese squad for the 2013 African Youth Championship.

International career

International goals
Scores and results list DR Congo's goal tally first.

References 

1993 births
Living people
Democratic Republic of the Congo footballers
Democratic Republic of the Congo international footballers
2013 African U-20 Championship players
Association football forwards
21st-century Democratic Republic of the Congo people
Democratic Republic of the Congo A' international footballers
2020 African Nations Championship players
AS Vita Club players